Colymbetes is a genus of beetles native to the Palearctic, including Europe, the Nearctic, the Near East and North Africa.

It contains the following species:

 Colymbetes aemulus Heer, 1862
 Colymbetes dahuricus Aubé, 1837
 Colymbetes densus LeConte, 1859
 Colymbetes dolabratus (Paykull, 1798)
 Colymbetes exaratus LeConte, 1862
 Colymbetes fuscus (Linnaeus, 1758)
 Colymbetes incognitus Zimmerman, 1981
 Colymbetes koenigi Zaitzev, 1927
 Colymbetes magnus Feng, 1936
 Colymbetes mesepotamicus Abdul-Karim & Ali, 1986
 Colymbetes minimus Zaitzev, 1908
 Colymbetes miocaenicus Riha, 1974
 Colymbetes paykulli Erichson, 1837
 Colymbetes piceus Klug, 1834
 Colymbetes pseudostriatus Nilsson, 2002
 Colymbetes schildknechti Dettner, 1983
 Colymbetes sculptilis Harris, 1829
 Colymbetes semenowi (Jakovlev, 1896)
 Colymbetes striatus (Linnaeus, 1758)
 Colymbetes strigatus LeConte, 1852
 Colymbetes substrigatus Sharp, 1882
 Colymbetes tschitscherini (Jakovlev, 1896)
 Colymbetes vagans Sharp, 1882

 Names brought to synonymy
 Colymbetes elegans or Colymbetes multistriatus, synonyms for Copelatus posticatus

References

External links

Colymbetes at Fauna Europaea

Dytiscidae genera